James Arthur Garside (born 24 January 1885, date of death unknown) was an English footballer who played as a striker for Preston North End, Accrington Stanley (two spells), Liverpool (where he made five appearances in the Football League), Exeter City and Horwich RMI. He gained one representative cap with the Southern League XI.

References

External links
 LFC History profile

1885 births
English footballers
Liverpool F.C. players
Year of death missing
Association football forwards
Preston North End F.C. players
Accrington Stanley F.C. players
Exeter City F.C. players
Leigh Genesis F.C. players
English Football League players
Southern Football League representative players